Dissonance has several meanings related to conflict or incongruity:
Cognitive dissonance is a state of mental conflict.
 Cultural dissonance is an uncomfortable sense experienced by people in the midst of change in their cultural environment.
Consonance and dissonance in music are properties of an interval or chord (the quality of a discord)
Dissonance in poetry is the deliberate avoidance of assonance, i.e. patterns of repeated vowel sounds. Dissonance in poetry is similar to cacophony and the opposite of euphony.
 Dissonance (album), a 2009 album by Enuff Z'Nuff. 
Dissonance (film), a 2015 film.
 "Dissonance", a 2023 song by Lovebites from the album Judgement Day

See also
Dissonants (album)